Grantsmanship is the art of acquiring financial grants through the process of grant writing. This term is typically used when referring to the skills necessary to secure peer-reviewed research funding, but it can also apply more broadly to overall field of fundraising from private foundations, community foundations, corporate foundations, governments, and other grant-makers. 

The types of grants secured through effective grantsmanship include:

 Charitable grants, which generally provide money and/or in-kind resources in support of projects that benefit the public. 
 Research grants, which typically fund specific types of studies and research conducted by individuals, public agencies, schools, non-profit organizations, and corporations. 
 Artistic grants, or fellowships, which typically fund a specific artistic production or a particular artist/group.

These grants are not the same as scholarships or grants to students. These grants typically require a complex and all-encompassing application to the specific grant-maker in order for a recipient to be considered for a grant. 

The person who writes the grant application or proposal is called the grant writer.

Developing a project
Writing a successful grant proposal is a long process that begins with an idea. This idea should be one that will add to the understanding and knowledge of science, medicine, social issues, or other areas that will benefit the common good of society. Writers must spend time considering and conceptualizing how to complete the desired project or program. To help the writer visualize the big picture, drawing a plan or flow chart can be helpful.

After an idea is conceived, it is time to begin the process of creating the grant proposal. “Successful proposal writing involves the coordination of several activities including planning, searching for data and resources, writing and packaging a proposal, submitting the proposal to a funder, and follow-up.”

Mission and goals
“Funders don’t give you money because an organization needs it; they give money because the organization can help them carry out their mission." A project wishing to receive funding must have goals and objectives that align with the funding source. Immediately after an idea is conceptualized, it is important to clarify the purpose of the project by writing a concise mission statement. Write out the project goals to achieve the mission and then the objectives that are specific activities that will lead to the accomplishment of the goals.

Significance
The significance of projects seeking funding can be divided into four categories: theoretical, methodological, applied, or social. A theoretical project contributes to basic knowledge and helps refine current theories in a particular area or proposes a new theory. A methodological project involves the use of new and innovative methods or improvement of existing methods. A project with an applied significance provides answers to real-world problems. Projects that provide society with something useful and valuable have social significance.

Searching for grants
When the idea has been developed into a proposal with goals and objectives, the writer must find the right grant. Resources to assist in finding grants are abundant. In some cases, online searches may help. Individuals and organizations in the United States may be able to apply for federal grants. In the U.S., a person seeking grant funding can also contact the Foundation Center Cooperating Collection which maintains a core collection of print and electronic directories of national grant funders.

Depending on the type of project there may be several possible sources for grants, and different funding agencies have different requirements and expectations.

Program officer
In some countries, grant funding agencies may have a program officer who helps organizations and individuals applying for a grant, and who can provide information regarding deadlines, budgetary requirements, and preferences. The officer may be able to offer suggestions, criticism, and advice, or technical assistance including draft reviews.

Successful grant proposals
Approved proposals are public documents which may be used as indicators of what the funding agency in question is looking for in a grant application. Some major agencies list recent grant recipients and titles of proposals online. In the United States, a grant writer may request copies from the funding agency using the Freedom of Information Act.

Collaboration
Many grant writers find that collaborating with other professionals when working on a grant proposal can be advantageous because it combines ideas, resources, and abilities. In order for collaboration to be a help rather than a hindrance to the process, it is important to be certain that the people working together have the same work habits to develop clarity and focus and identify gaps in thinking and planning. Qualified experts and interested individuals familiar with the organization and its projects will add quality to the committee, but the grant writer is the key person in the group. The writer will lead, inspire and coordinate the activities and responsibilities of the committee members.

Parts of the proposal
There are several components included in all grant proposals. An abstract, narrative, literature review and/or data, and methodology are included in all proposals. Some grant funders require more information in a proposal. Many funding agencies now require that applicants include an evaluation plan that shows how the grant recipient will determine if the project is successful or not. Additional information that might be required is data analysis, time tables, letters of support, or plans for dissemination.

Title page 
The title page creates the first impression for reviewers. Some funding may have specific requirements for a title page.  Typically the title page will include the project title, the institution's name and the date.

Abstract 
The abstract is the most read section of the proposal.  The abstract is usually 200–300 words and summarizes all parts of the grant application including key elements such as the general purpose, specific goals, research designs, methods of evaluation, contribution rationale, and the potential impact of project.  It should serve as an accurate description of the proposal when it stands alone.

Narrative 
The narrative is a longer and more detailed explanation of the project. It contains the statement of need and documents the credibility of the applicant's ability to successfully undertake the project and reach the anticipated goals.

Literature review 
In the literature review section, the writer will show that he or she has done the necessary research to show that the proposed work will fit into what has already been done in the field. The literature review will show through data that he or she has gathered that the grant will address theoretical, research-based or social issues. This section should include critical evaluation of the literature, show more than one side, and indicate how his or her project is relevant to future research.

Research data 
Depending on the type of proposal being submitted, research data that has already been conducted can help prove the relevance and need for new research. Historical data, statistical analysis, graphs and figures, and long term projections can aid in justifying the agency's funding of the project.

Methodology 
The methodology is the plan that will be used to accomplish the aims of the project. In this section the writer will explain the specific processes and activities that will be used to conduct research or address social issues. Descriptive, historical, and some theoretical projects greatly depend on methodology just as experimental studies do.

In this section, the writer will also describe the sample of participants for the project and tell how he or she will gain access to these participants. He will explain the procedures and processes from the participants’ perspective. If there are multiple groups of participants in a research project, the writer will discuss how cross contamination will be prevented.

Potential difficulties and limitations of the proposed procedure should also be discussed. 

The method of data analysis is identified in this section. The writer will show a clear plan of the way the collected data will be analyzed so that a reviewer will have an accurate picture of the entire project.  This section is where the writer will prove to the reviewers that the methods being used are the most appropriate for the project and why other methods were not chosen.

Program evaluation 
In some types of applications, a program evaluation may be required. This is different from data analysis in the methodology section. This form of analysis evaluates the stated plan of action, the indicators, and specific measurements for assessing the project's progress toward achievement of the anticipated goals. The evaluation plan should include a formative evaluation to inform the effectiveness of various activities of the project and a summative evaluation to assess the impact and significance of the project on the target audience. The evaluation plan will address the success of the results that can be attributed to the project.

Dissemination of information 
The dissemination of information is the way in which the organization plans to share the information gained or successful results of the project with the academic, scientific and social worlds. Dissemination is an extension beyond the scientific exercise which makes an impact on the world.

A well-positioned proposal can show how the project can be integrated with service and teaching in course-based and field-based studies. The plan should reflect that the dissemination efforts will be tailored to a target audience and help develop an ongoing, productive relationship with groups dealing with the very problems that the proposed study or project will explore. Proposals that move the latest findings out of the experimental setting into the classroom, home, or community are more likely to be awarded funding than those that will take longer to show desired results.

Some suggested mechanisms for dissemination are websites, publications, presentations at conferences, training and education, and/or public outreach through museums or libraries.

Budget 
The budget is usually considered last after the merits of the proposal have been decided. This does not mean that it is less important than the other parts of the proposal.

The budget spells out project costs and shows in a spreadsheet or a table detailed line items. The most important parts of the project will be allocated the most money. A project budget may include costs for personnel, equipment, rental of office or laboratory space, and research or conference trips.

Appendices 
An appendix includes supplementary data or information to give more in-depth analysis or clarification. Some items included in an appendix are time tables, work plans, schedules, activities, methodologies, legal paperwork, and letters of support or endorsements from the community.

Suggestions for specific types of proposals
If the proposal is experimental and focuses on new research, it probably consists of a complex series of experiments. After explaining each experiment, restate the point of completing this activity and how it relates to the main purpose of the study. At the end of the methodology section, it is important for the writer to summarize how all of the experiments converge to reach the expected outcome of the project.

In a sociolinguistic or theoretical project, the reviewers should be given information about the people who will be interviewed. It is important that they understand how the elicitation procedures will be adequate to obtain the varied population of participants needed for the study. The grant writer needs to explain why the population or database is the right one to work with and how it is capable of providing the kinds of data needed to address the issues of the project. The grant writer should provide samples of data already obtained if possible. Research that will be based on field work will need to be explained carefully for the reviewers to have a clear picture the work that will be completed. They should know that the participants conducting the field work are aware of the conditions they will be working in and are prepared to cope with the elements of the environment.

If the project is exploratory or descriptive work, the grant writer should explain the intrinsic value of doing this kind of research and the theoretical relevance. For a proposal aimed at creating a descriptive grammar or dictionary, the grant writer should explain why this document would be significant to the field being studied, the method of organization to be used, the potential users, and how the new book will be better than existing ones.

Steps after funding decisions are made
After the grant proposal is submitted, the decision making process may take several months. The only thing that is certain is that there are only two end results—funding or rejection. It has been suggested that, particularly for "high risk" or "innovative" research programmes, the likelihood of rejection can partially depend on seasonal variation in the evaluators' perception of risk. Regardless of the outcome, there are steps that remain in the grant writing process.

Receiving the grant 
As soon as a grant writer is aware that the project has been funded, he or she needs to write a letter of appreciation acknowledging the award. The simplest way that organizations and grant writers are notified that they have received the grant funding is by receiving a cover letter and check by mail. However, many funding agencies require much more. Some agencies require that a contract is agreed upon and returned with the appropriate signatures before the organization can be awarded the grant money. A major part of most of these contracts is a stipulation that a pre-determined number of reports are submitted to the funding agency. If a contract is required, the grant writer should read it carefully and make notes of any requirements or reports that are required. If reports are requested, make sure that they are submitted on time. If a problem arises and the report will be late, the grant writer should be sure to send a written notification and call to make the funder aware of this.

If there is an opportunity for a grant to be renewed, the organization should immediately begin collecting artifacts that show the quality of work being completed and achieved during each step of the project. Another important factor after receiving funding is to remain flexible. Funders might ask for adjustments in methods, evaluation or budget. The organization must be willing to alter or modify activities, evaluation or time lines when asked to by the funding agency. Being flexible and willing to work cooperatively with the funding agency are key components in developing positive relationship with the grant funder. This could put the organization and the grant writer in a favorable position for future opportunities between the grant recipient and the funding agency.

Rejection 
Rejection is never easy to accept, but it is a reality that only a few of the grant proposals will be funded each cycle. If the grant writer does not hear about the outcome of the grant reviews, it may be necessary to contact the funding agency. Not all agencies notify applicants who were not awarded a grant. Follow-up is important, and a positive phone call is an appropriate way of making contact. When talking to the program officer, the grant writer must avoid feeling angry or combative. The decisions made by the review board were not personal; they were based on how well the goals and expected outcomes of each proposal aligned with the mission of the funding agency. The writer should try to make the call positive and try to determine whether it would be advantageous to reapply in the future.

The next step in the follow-up process is to request copies of the reviewers' comments. These are not sent automatically. It is essential for the grant writer to know why the project was rejected. After reading the comments, the writer may realize that the rejection had very little to do with quality of the proposal. The funding agency may have been flooded with applications; and, although they liked the proposal and saw the significance and relevance, they simply ran out of money. Another cause of rejection could be a small point of confusion that the grant writer can easily resolve and resubmit the proposal in the next cycle.

These are the best circumstances in which to accept rejection, but most often the rejection is more difficult to overcome because it is due to a lack of merit or the quality of the grant application. It may be hard for the grant writer to read negative comments about a proposal that he or she spent so much time and energy to develop and compose. For some writers it may take a cooling off period before he or she is ready to read the negative comments, and this is an appropriate, positive way to handle the rejection.

As tempting as it may be for the grant writer to dismiss the comments of the reviewers, it is in the best interest of the organization to address the suggestions and criticism made about the proposal. The grant writer needs to read and evaluate the reviewers' comments as objectively as possible. After considering the comments about the proposal, he or she should reconsider the alignment of the project goals and the funding agency's mission. If the writer recognizes an incongruity of the goals, his or her time will be better spent finding a new grant to apply for. However, if the grant writer still feels that the goals correspond, he or she needs to determine why the proposal did not work, make necessary changes, resubmit the proposal at the next cycle.

The grant writer must understand that rejection does not mean that a proposal should be abandoned. It can be revived and revised and resubmitted. Many grant proposal applications are only successful on the second or third submission.
The only time a grant writer can be certain that the grant will not receive funding is when the proposal is not submitted.

If the grant writer feels that it is worthwhile to resubmit the proposal in the future, he or she must determine the components of the grant application that need improvement. One way to determine these areas is to have a colleague who is not involved with the project evaluate the reviewers' comments and assess their validity. His or her assessment of the criticisms will assist in developing the proposal in the future. Looking at the criticism through someone else's eyes will help the grant writer become more objective.

The grant writer needs to determine the areas of the proposal are weak, confusing, or unsupported. Does the narrative fail to establish the alignment of the goals of the proposal and the funding agency? Does the literature review not show how the project is relevant to the field of study? Does the methodology need to be redesigned? Is the evaluation plan inadequate to determine if the expected goals were met? Is the budget unrealistic? It is imperative that the grant writer meticulously examine the proposal and identify the areas that need to be improved, modified, or eliminated. This will allow him or her to create a document that better communicates the merits of the proposal and how it can contribute to the funding agency's mission.

References

External links
 http://www.justice.gov/oip/foia_updates/Vol_XVII_4/page2.htm
 http://foundationcenter.org/collections/
 http://www.grants.gov/applicants/find_grant_opportunities.jsp

Grants (money)